Parvarish may refer to:

Parvarish (1958 film), a 1958 Bollywood film
Parvarish (1977 film), a 1977 Hindi crime drama film
Parvarrish – Kuchh Khattee Kuchh Meethi, a 2011 Indian soap opera
Parvarish (2014 TV series), a 2014 Pakistani television series